The Orfey-class destroyers were built for the Baltic Fleet of the Imperial Russian Navy. They were modified versions of the earlier destroyer  and the s. These ships were larger, had triple torpedo tubes and an extra  gun. One ship, Engels, was fitted with a  recoilless rifle for testing in 1934. Fourteen ships were completed in 1914–1917 and fought in World War I and during the Allied intervention in the Russian Civil War. The survivors fought in World War II.

Ships
Built at the Putilov yard, St Petersburg

Built at Metal Works, St Petersburg (Petrograd)

Built by Russo Baltic Yard, Reval

Bibliography

External links

 
Destroyer classes
Destroyers of the Estonian Navy